Tonino Carotone (born Antonio de la Cuesta on 9 January 1970 in Burgos, Spain) is a Spanish singer-songwriter. His stage name "Tonino Carotone", which is translatable in English as Tony Pokerface, is inspired by his great idol, the Italian pop pianist and singer Renato Carosone. The majority of his childhood and adolescence were spent in Pamplona, Spain. In 1995, Tonino moved to Italy, where he gained success five years later after releasing the single Me cago en el amor (a slang idiom from Navarre meaning "I curse love", but literally translatable as "I shit on love") from his debut album Mondo difficile ("Difficult World"). In 2003, Tonino released another album, Senza Ritorno ("With No Return").

Discography

Albums
 Ciao Mortali ("Hello Mortals") (Bloom Produzioni, 2008)
 Senza Ritorno (Virgin, 2003)
 Mondo Difficile (Virgin, 1999)

Singles
 Me Cago en el Amor (Virgin, 1999)

Collaborations
 La Mulata - Locomondo  (2017)
La Radiolina – Manu Chao (Virgin, 2007)
 Bahia Sound System – Compilation (2006)
 Malacabeza – Arpioni (Alternative, 2005)
 Buona Mista Social Ska! – Arpioni (Gridalo Forte Records, 2001)
 Los Guachos – Karamelo Santo (Benditas Producciones, 2001)
 Fuerza Volume 1 – Compilation (Virgin, 2000)
 Peret Rey de la Rumba – Compilation (Virgin, 2000)

Other works
Tonino Carotone and Manu Chao performed the theme song for Drew Carey's Green Screen Show, titled La Trampa.

In 2006, Tonino and writer Federico Traversa released a book titled Il Maestro dell'Ora Brava.

Previous to his solo work, Tonino formed part of the Pamplona based group Kojón Prieto y los Huajolotes, gaining a moderate following before disbanding in 1995.

Bibliography
 Tonino Carotone & Federico Traversa, Il Maestro dell'ora Brava, Genova, Chinaski Edizioni, 2006

References

External links
 Official Website (in Italian and English)

1970 births
Living people
Spanish singer-songwriters
21st-century Spanish singers